Adam Scott may refer to:

 Adam Scott (actor) (born 1973), American actor, comedian, producer, and podcaster
 Adam Scott (golfer) (born 1980), Australian professional golfer
 Adam Scott (footballer)
 Adam Scott (politician), a candidate from the Green Party of Ontario in the 2003 Ontario provincial election
 Adam Scott Collegiate and Vocational Institute, a high school and middle school in Peterborough, Ontario, Canada

See also

 Scott Adams (disambiguation)